Michele Panebianco (20 December 1806 - 4 April 1873) was an Italian painter. He was born and died in Messina.

Life
He studied in Rome under Letterio Subba then Vincenzo Camuccini,. He headed Messina's scuola di belle arti. Many of his religious works were destroyed in the 1908 Messina earthquake, whilst surviving ones are in the Museo Regionale di Messina and various churches in Sicily. He was one of the first teachers of Lio Gangeri.

Works
Arrival of the Magi, copy of the original recorded in Sant'Andrea church, Messina
 Nativity, oil on panel, copy of the original recorded in the Alto Basso church, Messina; original moved from the monastic church of San Gregorio to the Museo Civico Peloritano (now known as the Museo Regionale) and re-attributed from Polidoro da Caravaggio
 The Stigmatization of St Francis, Montevergine church, Messina
 Apostles, oil on panel, produced to complete the altarpiece in Santa Maria Assunta, Castroreale
 St Francis of Assisi, fresco, on the vault originally decorated with a fresco by Filippo Tancredi destroyed in the 1783 Calabrian earthquakes, recorded in the Oratorio di San Francesco alle Stimmate in the church of San Francesco dei Mercanti.
 Vara dell'Assunta, prints, Museo della Vara, Palazzo Zanca, Messina.

References 

Painters from Messina
1806 births
1873 deaths
19th-century Italian painters